"Tennessee Waltz" is a popular country music song with lyrics by Redd Stewart and music by Pee Wee King written in 1946 and first released in January 1948. The song became a multimillion seller via a 1950 recording – as "The Tennessee Waltz" – by Patti Page.
 	
All versions of the lyrics narrate a situation in which the persona has introduced his or her sweetheart to a friend who then waltzes away with her or him. The lyrics are altered for pronoun gender on the basis of the gender of the singer.

The popularity of "Tennessee Waltz" made it the fourth official song of the state of Tennessee in 1965. Page's recording was inducted into Grammy Hall of Fame in 1998.

Early versions

Pee Wee King, Redd Stewart, and their fellow Golden West Cowboys members were en route to Nashville "close to Christmas in 1946" when King and Stewart, who were riding in a truck carrying the group's equipment, heard Bill Monroe's new song "Kentucky Waltz" on the radio. Stewart had an idea to write a Tennessee waltz using the melody of King's theme song: "No Name Waltz",  and wrote the lyrics on a matchbox as he and King thought up the words. King and Stewart presented "Tennessee Waltz" to music publisher Fred Rose the next day, and Rose adjusted one line of Stewart's lyric: "O the Tennessee waltz, O the Tennessee Waltz," to "I remember the night and the Tennessee Waltz."

A considerable amount of time passed before Pee Wee King's Golden West Cowboys were able to record "Tennessee Waltz". Their recording was made in a December 2, 1947 session at the RCA Victor Studio in Chicago. Its release as Victor (20–2680) was noted the following month. 300,000 copies were sold for this release.

Acuff-Rose Music, the publisher, did not immediately register a copyright to the song when it was presented to the company by King and Stewart and did not obtain the "consummate proof of ownership, and the key to protecting a songwriter's property" until February 1948.

A version by Cowboy Copas, a former member of the Golden West Cowboys was released by King Records (King 696) two months later in March 1948. 80,000 copies were sold.

Both singles became Top Ten C&W hits – the chart was then known as "Best Selling Folk Retail Records" – in the spring and summer of 1948 with respective peaks of No. 3 (Pee Wee King's Golden West Cowboys) and No. 6 (Cowboy Copas).

Patti Page version

The most successful version of the song was recorded by Patti Page. In October 1950, an R&B version by Erskine Hawkins was released and reviewed on Billboard, and the reviewer Jerry Wexler brought the song to the attention of Page's manager, Jack Rael, and suggested that the song could be a hit for Page. Page and Rael listened to Hawkins' version, and proceeded to record the song quickly despite lacking an arrangement for the song. Page cut "The Tennessee Waltz" in a November 1950 session in New York City with Rael conducting his orchestra: her vocal was cut multitracked with three voices, with two, and as a single voice with Page herself selecting the two-voice multitracked vocal featured on the single as released. Patti Page's recording  was originally intended to serve as an obscure B-side to "Boogie Woogie Santa Claus" (Catalog# 5534), as the label Mercury Records was more interested in the seasonal single at that time of the year, but it was "The Tennessee Waltz" that became a hit.

"The Tennessee Waltz" entered the Pop Music chart of Billboard dated November 10, 1950 for a 30-week chart run and peaked at number one on the December 30, 1950 chart; the track would remain at number one for a total of nine weeks. (After the initial pressings "Boogie Woogie Santa Claus" was replaced as the B-side by "Long Long Ago".) A No. 2 C&W hit, "The Tennessee Waltz" became Page's career record. On the Cash Box charts, "Tennessee Waltz" reached No. 1 on December 30, 1950, with the Patti Page, Jo Stafford, Guy Lombardo and Les Paul/Mary Ford versions being given a single ranking; as such "Tennessee Waltz" remained No. 1 in Cash Box through the February 3, 1951 chart. The song was also ranked No. 1 in England for multiple weeks.

Page's recording was reported to have sold 2.3 million copies by May 1951. Page's recording also inspired many other versions, and 4.8 million copies were sold for the various major versions combined, in addition to 1.8 million copies of sheet music sold, which made the song likely the most successful song in the history of pop music up to 1951 in the US. In Japan, the song was the biggest-selling song ever as of 1974.

The song was later included on Page's 1957 Mercury album This Is My Song. It was also re-recorded (in stereo, and with a different arrangement) for her 1966 Columbia Records album Patti Page's Greatest Hits.

Charts

Other contemporary versions

The success of the Patti Page version led to covers by Les Paul with Mary Ford (Capitol 1316) and Jo Stafford (Columbia 39065) both of which reached the Top Ten – Stafford's at No. 7 and Paul/Ford at No. 6 (the latter was a double-sided hit with "Little Rock Getaway" reaching number 18). Also in 1951, the version by Guy Lombardo and his Royal Canadians (Decca 27336) reached No. 6 in the US. Guy Lombardo's version sold nearly 600,000 copies while Les Paul sold 500,000 copies by May 1951.

The Fontane Sisters made their first solo recording cutting "Tennessee Waltz" in a November 1950 session at RCA Victor Studios in New York City; the track would reach the Top 20 in 1951. In addition, the original version – credited to Pee Wee King – was re-released to reach No. 6 C&W in 1951. A further 100,000 copies were sold in addition to the 300,000 copies sold in the previous release.

Spike Jones and his City Slickers recorded a parody featuring a duet with singers sporting Yiddish accents, and this version reached No. 13 in January 1951. A version by Anita O'Day & the All Stars Top Songs reached No. 24.

Other recordings were made by  Petula Clark for the UK market, and by Chiemi Eri for the Japanese market.

Later recordings

Ivo Robić recorded "Tennessee Waltz" for his 1957 album Cowboyske Pjesme ("Cowboy Songs").

Margaret Whiting recorded the song for her album Margaret in 1958.

"Tennessee Waltz" returned to the charts in the fall of 1959 with a rockabilly version recorded by both Bobby Comstock & the Counts and Jerry Fuller: on the Billboard Hot 100 the versions respectively reached No. 52 and No. 63 while Cash Box assigned both versions a joint ranking on its Top 100 Singles chart with a peak position of No. 42.
	
In 1962, Damita Jo had a non-charting single release of "Tennessee Waltz".  Patsy Cline also recorded The Tennessee Waltz for Decca records in 1962.

In 1964, "Tennessee Waltz" was recorded in a rock and roll ballad style by Alma Cogan; this version was No. 1 in Sweden for five weeks and also reached No. 14 in Denmark while a German language rendering (with lyrics by Theo Hansen) reached No. 10 in Germany. Cogan's version served as template for the arrangement of the 1974 Danish-language rendering "Den Gamle Tennessee Waltz" by Birthe Kjær which spent 17 weeks in the Top Ten of the Danish hit parade with a two-week tenure at No. 1 also spending an additional eight weeks at No. 2. The arrangement of Cogan's version was also borrowed for remakes of "Tennessee Waltz" by Swedish singers Kikki Danielsson (Wizex (on the 1978 album Miss Decibel)) and Lotta Engberg (on the 2000 album Vilken härlig dag) and – with the German lyrics – by Heidi Brühl, Gitte, Renate Kern and Ireen Sheer.

Sam Cooke recorded a double-time version of "Tennessee Waltz"  for his Ain't That Good News album recorded January 28, 1964 at the RCA Studio in Hollywood. Released 1 March 1, 1964, Ain't That Good News would be the final album release of new material by Cooke, and "Tennessee Waltz", coupled with another album track: "Good Times",  would be the final Sam Cooke single released during the singer's lifetime, with "Tennessee Waltz", the original B-side, becoming sufficiently popular to chart at No. 35. Cooke performed "Tennessee Waltz" – and also "Blowin' in the Wind" – as a guest on the premiere of Shindig! broadcast September 16, 1964. The October 1964 live album release Sam Cooke at the Copa also features "Tennessee Waltz".

Al Hirt released a version on his 1965 album, Live at Carnegie Hall.

A French-language pop version of the song (as "Cette danse") was recorded by Canadian singer Renée Martel in 1965.

Ray Brown & the Whispers had a No. 4 hit in Australia in 1966 with a rockabilly version of "Tennessee Waltz" released as "Tennessee Waltz Song".

In 1966, Otis Redding recorded a version of "Tennessee Waltz" featuring Booker T & the MGs on his R&B album, Complete & Unbelievable: The Otis Redding Dictionary of Soul cut at the Stax Studio in Memphis, Tennessee: Redding was familiar with "Tennessee Waltz" from the album Sam Cooke at the Copa.

Manfred Mann included a version of the song on their number-one EP in 1966.

In 1967, Dobie Gray recorded "Tennessee Waltz" as the B-side of a non-charting version of "River Deep - Mountain High": both sides of the single were produced and arranged by Leon Russell.

Johnny Jones – a native of Atlanta who had briefly replaced Sam Cooke in the Soul Stirrers before Johnnie Taylor joined the group – reached No. 49 R&B in 1968 with his deep soul rendition of "Tennessee Waltz" cut for producer Bobby Robinson's Fury Records.

In July 1971, Cymarron recorded "Tennessee Waltz" in the sessions for their self-titled album produced by Chips Moman at his American Sound Studio in Memphis.

In 1972, American Spring recorded a cover of "Tennessee Waltz" produced by Brian Wilson to open their debut album, Spring.

David Bromberg includes a live version on his 1972 album, Demon in Disguise, on Columbia Records.

Lacy J. Dalton recorded "Tennessee Waltz" for her 1979 self-titled debut album recorded at CBS Studio in Nashville, Tennessee: issued as a single in 1980 Dalton's gritty reworking of the song reached No. 18 on the C&W – the sole C&W charting of "Tennessee Waltz" since 1951.

Ultimate hipster Mose Allison featured a "cool jazz" version of the song on his album Middle Class White Boy (1982).

In 1983, the song was featured on the James Brown album Bring It On (Churchill Records).

American R&B and boogie-woogie pianist and singer Little Willie Littlefield recorded a version for his 1990 album Singalong with Little Willie Littlefield.

Norah Jones performed "Tennessee Waltz" as an encore during a live show at the House of Blues in New Orleans on August 24, 2002. It is featured as extra material on the following DVD-release of the show.

Leonard Cohen released a live version of  "Tennessee Waltz" recorded in 1985– one of the few covers he's ever cut – on his 2004 album Dear Heather; this version featured an additional verse written by Cohen himself.

Belle and Sebastian used the melody from "Tennessee Waltz" in their song "Slow Graffiti".

Other artists who have recorded "Tennessee Waltz" (with the parent album) include: LaVern Baker (Woke Up This Mornin''' 1993), Pat Boone (I'll See You in My Dreams/ 1962), Eva Cassidy (Imagine/ 2002), Holly Cole (Don't Smoke in Bed 1993), Connie Francis (Country & Western Golden Hits/ 1959), Emmylou Harris (Cimarron 1981), Tom Jones backed by The Chieftains (Long Black Veil 1995), (1995), Pete Molinari (Today, Tomorrow and Forever 2009), Anne Murray (Let's Keep It That Way 1978), Elvis Presley, Billie Jo Spears (Country Girl 1981), Lenny Welch, Kitty Wells (Kitty's Choice/ 1960), Dottie West (Feminine Fancy/ 1968), Margaret Whiting (Margaret/ 1958), Broadway's Kerry Conte and Mike Rosengarten (An Evening With... Vol. 1/ 2019).

Kelly Clarkson performed the song at the 2013 Grammy Awards as part of a tribute to Patti Page.

Other performances
The University of Tennessee Pride of the Southland Band performs Tennessee Waltz at the end of each home game at Neyland Stadium and Thompson–Boling Arena
in Knoxville as the fans are filing out of those venues.   East Tennessee State University's Marching Bucs perform the song during their pregame show. After every home game, the Appalachian State University Marching Mountaineers and the Middle Tennessee State University Band of Blue perform the song during their post-game show. Baylor University's Golden Wave Band plays the song at the end of each home game, a tradition possibly begun with a request from former Head Coach Grant Teaff. The Tennessee Waltz is also the corps song of Music City Drum and Bugle Corps, a Drum Corps International World Class corps from Nashville. The UTC Marching Mocs perform the Tennessee Waltz during their pregame show.

Use in media

The song was also used in an instrumental form in the final scenes of the film Primary Colors where Jack Stanton dances with his wife at his Inauguration Ball. It was also used briefly during the 1983 drama film, The Right Stuff.  John Huston's 1979 Wise Blood, an adaptation of a Flannery O'Connor novel, uses an instrumental version during the opening montage and as a recurrent musical theme throughout the picture.
Also at the beginning of the French movie Les Cowboys (2015), the song was played by François Damiens.
Patti Page's version features in Zabriskie Point.  The song is also featured in the Schitt's Creek TV series, season 1 episode 12, "Surprise Party" and in the 1999 Japanese film Poppoya''.

See also
 Love triangle

References

1946 songs
1948 singles
1950 singles
Songs written by Pee Wee King
Songs written by Redd Stewart
Patti Page songs
The Fontane Sisters songs
Lacy J. Dalton songs
Roy Acuff songs
Little Willie Littlefield songs
Al Hirt songs
Guy Lombardo songs
Number-one singles in the United States
Number-one singles in Sweden
United States state songs
Waltzes
Music of Tennessee
Songs about Tennessee